James B. Stewart  (1947) is an American economist who is Professor Emeritus of Labor and Employment Relations, African and African American Studies, and Management and Organization at Pennsylvania State University. In 2021, he was awarded the Samuel Z. Westerfield Award, the highest award of the National Economic Association.

Education and early life 

Stewart grew up in the Mt. Pleasant neighborhood of Cleveland, Ohio. He studied math at Rose Hulman Institute of Technology, where he was one of only 5 Black students in a student body of 1,000, and later earned a PhD in Economics from the University of Notre Dame.

Career 
Stewart taught at Penn State from 1980–2009, while writing or co-authoring 11 books and 65 articles in Economics and Black Studies. He is a past president of the National Economic Association, the National Council for Black Studies, and the Association for the Study of African American Life and History. He is a former editor of The Review of Black Political Economy.

Selected publications 

 Darity Jr, William A., Patrick L. Mason, and James B. Stewart. "The economics of identity: the origin and persistence of racial identity norms." Journal of Economic Behavior & Organization 60, no. 3 (2006): 283-305.
 Clark, Paul F., James B. Stewart, and Darlene A. Clark. "The globalization of the labour market for health-care professionals." Int'l Lab. Rev. 145 (2006): 37.
 Alridge, Derrick P., and James B. Stewart. "Introduction: Hip hop in history: Past, present, and future." The Journal of African American History 90, no. 3 (2005): 190-195.
 Macpherson, David A., and James B. Stewart. "The effect of international competition on union and nonunion wages." ILR Review 43, no. 4 (1990): 434-446.
 Stewart, James B., and Thomas Hyclak. "An analysis of the earnings profiles of immigrants." The Review of Economics and Statistics (1984): 292-296.

References

External links 
Penn State page

Living people
1947 births
21st-century American economists
Rose–Hulman Institute of Technology alumni
University of Notre Dame alumni
African-American economists
Labor economists
Pennsylvania State University faculty
21st-century African-American people
Presidents of the National Economic Association
20th-century African-American people